Joyce Shore Butler (née Wells; 13 December 1910 – 2 January 1992) was a British Labour Co-operative politician. She was the long serving MP for Wood Green and was the first woman to chair an ad hoc committee.

Early life 
Butler was educated at King Edward's School, Birmingham, and Woodbrooke College.

Career 
Butler became a councillor on Wood Green Borough Council in 1947, serving until the borough's abolition in 1965.  She was chairman of the Housing committee and Leader of the Labour Group on Wood Green Council. She was an alderman and the first chairman of the new London Borough of Haringey in 1964.

Butler was first elected to Parliament at the 1955 general election, for the Wood Green constituency. She served as Parliamentary Private Secretary to the Minister of Land and Natural Resources 1965-67 but held no front-bench position. She served as vice-chair of the Parliamentary Labour Party and chair of the group of Co-operative Party MPs. She retired from Parliament at the 1979 general election.

Interests 
Butler was an active back-bencher, frequently raising questions in parliament on environmental and consumer issues. She often spoke on a range of health issues and asked the first parliamentary questions about the thalidomide drug.

In 1964 Butler founded the Women's Cervical Cancer Control Campaign (later the Women's National Cancer Control Campaign). In 1976, she introduced a Bill to create a statutory register of all osteopaths who followed a recognized course of study.

Butler also served as President of the National Antivaccination League.

Butler's "most important achievement" was introducing the first bill to Parliament seeking to outlaw discrimination against women "in education, employment, and social and public life".  She raised the Bill four times - starting in 1967 - and whilst she failed to obtain a second reading, her Bill would form the basis of the Labour Government's Sex Discrimination Act (1975).   

Following her retirement in 1979, she remained a leading member in a number of organisations, such as the London Passenger Action Confederation, the Fawcett Society, the Hornsey Housing Trust, and Tottenham Hotspur ladies' football team.

Personal life 
She married Vic Butler, a Co-operative Party worker who became a councillor, the first mayor of the London Borough of Haringey and a parliamentary candidate. They had two children.

References

1910 births
1992 deaths
Labour Co-operative MPs for English constituencies
Female members of the Parliament of the United Kingdom for English constituencies
Councillors in Greater London
UK MPs 1955–1959
UK MPs 1959–1964
UK MPs 1964–1966
UK MPs 1966–1970
UK MPs 1970–1974
UK MPs 1974
UK MPs 1974–1979
20th-century British women politicians
20th-century English women
20th-century English people
Women councillors in England